Iraq first participated at the Olympic Games in 1948. Iraqis missed the 1952 and boycotted the 1956 games over opposition to the Suez Crisis. Following this absence, Iraq returned to win a Bronze medal at the 1960 Summer Olympics in Rome. They participated in the next three games but once again did not appear in the 1972 and 1976 games to boycott apartheid South Africa. In joining the 1976 Boycott, Iraq became only the second non-African state to participate in the boycott (the other being Guyana). Since 1980, Iraq has appeared in every game despite the Iraq Wars. On April 9, 2003, the National Olympic Committee of Iraq building in Baghdad was damaged in looting and fires from looters. Iraq's Olympic program recovered in time to compete in the Athens Olympics the following year, and the Iraq football team almost won a bronze medal but were defeated by Italy in the bronze medal match. Iraq has never competed at the Winter Olympic Games.

Iraq has only won one medal since they have entered the games. They won a bronze medal, in weightlifting at the 1960 Summer Olympics.

They have been represented by National Olympic Committee of Iraq since entering.

Medal tables

Medals by sport

List of medalists

See also 

 Abdul-Wahid Aziz
 Iraq at the Paralympics
 List of flag bearers for Iraq at the Olympics

External links
 
 
 
 Official Olympic Reports

 
Olympics